Sarah Jackson (née Yorke; July 1805 – August 23, 1887) was the daughter-in-law of U.S. President Andrew Jackson.  She served as White House hostess and first lady of the United States from November 26, 1834, to March 4, 1837.

Biography

Early life
Sarah was born in July 1805 (day unknown), into a wealthy family in Philadelphia, Pennsylvania. Her father Peter Yorke, a sea captain and successful merchant, died in 1815. Her mother Mary Haines Yorke died during a trip to New Orleans in 1820, leaving Sarah and her two sisters orphaned. She was raised by two aunts, Mrs. George Farquhar and Mrs. Mordecai Wetherill.

Adult life
Sarah married Andrew Jackson, Jr., the adopted son of Andrew Jackson, in Philadelphia on November 24, 1831. After an extended honeymoon at the White House, the new couple left for The Hermitage, Jackson's plantation in Tennessee. The couple remained at the Hermitage managing the plantation until a fire destroyed much of the main house in 1834. The couple and their two young children went to Washington to live with President Jackson at the White House.

Sarah arrived at the White House on November 26, 1834. She immediately began to take on the role as co-hostess of the White House along with the President's niece Emily Donelson, who had served as White House hostess and unofficial First Lady since the beginning of the president's term in office. The president referred to Sarah as the "mistress of the Hermitage" rather than White House hostess, apparently to avoid any possible ill feeling between the two women. The arrangement was somewhat awkward but appeared to work relatively smoothly. It was the only time in history when there were two women simultaneously acting as White House hostess. She took over all duties as White House hostess after Emily Donelson fell ill with tuberculosis and died in 1836.

Sarah remained at the White House until Jackson's term expired in 1837, but made several lengthy trips including one to the Hermitage to oversee its reconstruction. After the death of 78-year-old General Jackson on June 8, 1845, debt accumulated during his time in office spiraled out of control under the continued poor management of the Hermitage by Andrew Jackson Jr. This forced the sale of the Hermitage to the state of Tennessee in 1856. With moneys from the sale, Andrew Jr. eventually purchased several properties near Bay St. Louis, Mississippi, where they would eventually move in February 1859. It was a short-lived venture due to both Andrew Jr's bad judgement and weather-related disasters. By fall 1860, they returned to the Hermitage, where they ended up as tenants of the state. It would be a very meager existence for the Jacksons for the next 30 years. Sarah lost her husband to a hunting accident in 1865 and her son Samuel in the Battle of Chickamauga during the Civil War. Sarah died at the Hermitage in 1887, two years before the Ladies Hermitage Association acquired the Hermitage back from the state of Tennessee and began restoring it.

Death
Sarah Yorke Jackson  died on August 23, 1887 in Nashville, Tennessee at the age of 82.

References

1803 births
1887 deaths
19th-century American women
First ladies of the United States
People from Nashville, Tennessee
People from Philadelphia
Andrew Jackson family